The 2003 Northern Arizona Lumberjacks football team was an American football team that represented Northern Arizona University (NAU) as a member of the Big Sky Conference (Big Sky) during the 2003 NCAA Division I-AA football season. In their sixth year under head coach Jerome Souers, the Lumberjacks compiled a 9–4 record (5–2 against conference opponents), outscored opponents by a total of 409 to 305, and finished in a three-way tie for the Big Sky championship.

The Lumberjacks were invited to play in the 2003 NCAA Division I-AA playoffs and defeated No. 1 McNeese State on the road in Lake Charles, Louisiana. It was the program's first ever victory in the Division I-AA playoffs. They then advanced to the Quarterfinals, losing to No. 13 Florida Atlantic.

The team played its home games at the J. Lawrence Walkup Skydome, commonly known as the Walkup Skydome, in Flagstaff, Arizona.

The team's statistical leaders included Roger Robinson with 1,108 rushing yards and Jason Murietta with 3,472 passing yards (including 431 yards against Sacramento State), Clarence Moore with 1,184 receiving yards, and Paul Ernster with 101 points scored.

Schedule

References

Northern Arizona
Northern Arizona Lumberjacks football seasons
Big Sky Conference football champion seasons
Northern Arizona Lumberjacks football